Euclid's theorem is a fundamental statement in number theory that asserts that there are infinitely many prime numbers. It was first proved by Euclid in his work Elements. There are several proofs of the theorem.

Euclid's proof
Euclid offered a proof published in his work Elements (Book IX, Proposition 20), which is paraphrased here.

Consider any finite list of prime numbers p1, p2, ..., pn. It will be shown that at least one additional prime number not in this list exists. Let P be the product of all the prime numbers in the list: P = p1p2...pn. Let q = P + 1. Then q is either prime or not:

If q is prime, then there is at least one more prime that is not in the list, namely, q itself.
If q is not prime, then some prime factor p divides q. If this factor p were in our list, then it would divide P (since P is the product of every number in the list); but p also divides P + 1 = q, as just stated. If p divides P and also q, then p must also divide the difference of the two numbers, which is (P + 1) − P or just 1. Since no prime number divides 1, p cannot be in the list. This means that at least one more prime number exists beyond those in the list.

This proves that for every finite list of prime numbers there is a prime number not in the list. In the original work, as Euclid had no way of writing an arbitrary list of primes, he used a method that he frequently applied, that is, the method of generalizable example. Namely, he picks just three primes and using the general method outlined above, proves that he can always find an additional prime. Euclid presumably assumes that his readers are convinced that a similar proof will work, no matter how many primes are originally picked.

Euclid is often erroneously reported to have proved this result by contradiction beginning with the assumption that the finite set initially considered contains all prime numbers, though it is actually a proof by cases, a direct proof method. The philosopher Torkel Franzén, in a book on logic, states, "Euclid's proof that there are infinitely many primes is not an indirect proof [...] The argument is sometimes formulated as an indirect proof by replacing it with the assumption 'Suppose  are all the primes'. However, since this assumption isn't even used in the proof, the reformulation is pointless."

Variations
Several variations on Euclid's proof exist, including the following:

The factorial n! of a positive integer n is divisible by every integer from 2 to n, as it is the product of all of them. Hence,  is not divisible by any of the integers from 2 to n, inclusive (it gives a remainder of 1 when divided by each). Hence  is either prime or divisible by a prime larger than n. In either case, for every positive integer n, there is at least one prime bigger than n. The conclusion is that the number of primes is infinite.

Euler's proof

Another proof, by the Swiss mathematician Leonhard Euler, relies on the fundamental theorem of arithmetic: that every integer has a unique prime factorization. What Euler wrote (not with this modern notation and, unlike modern standards, not restricting the arguments in sums and products to any finite sets of integers) is equivalent to the statement that we have
 

In order to show this, one expands each factor in the product as a geometric series, and distributes the product over the sum (this is a special case of the Euler product formula for the Riemann zeta function). 

 

In the penultimate sum every product of primes appears exactly once, and so the last equality is true by the fundamental theorem of arithmetic. Then in his second corollary Euler notes that the product 
 
converges to the finite value 2, and that there are consequently more primes than squares («  sequitur infinities plures esse numeros primos »). This proves Euclid Theorem. 

 

In the same paper (Theorem 19) Euler in fact used the above equality to prove a much stronger theorem that was unknown before him, namely that the series 

Erdős's proof

Paul Erdős gave a proof that also relies on the fundamental theorem of arithmetic. Every positive integer has a unique factorization into a square-free number and a square number .  For example, .

Call those primes . Any positive integer  which is less than or equal to  can then be written in the form

And  can be at most , so . Thus, at most  numbers can be written in this form. In other words,

Since  was arbitrary,  can be as large as desired by choosing  appropriately.

Furstenberg's proof

In the 1950s, Hillel Furstenberg introduced a proof by contradiction using point-set topology.

Define a topology on the integers Z, called the evenly spaced integer topology, by declaring a subset U ⊆ Z to be an open set if and only if it is either the empty set, ∅, or it is a union of arithmetic sequences S(a, b) (for a ≠ 0), where

Then a contradiction follows from the property that a finite set of integers cannot be open and the property that the basis sets S(a, b) are both open and closed, since

cannot be closed because its complement is finite, but is closed since it is a finite union of closed sets.

Recent proofs

Proof using the inclusion-exclusion principle

Juan Pablo Pinasco has written the following proof.

Let p1, ..., pN be the smallest N primes. Then by the inclusion–exclusion principle, the number of positive integers less than or equal to x that are divisible by one of those primes is

 

Dividing by x and letting x → ∞ gives

 

This can be written as

 

If no other primes than p1, ..., pN exist, then the expression in (1) is equal to  and the expression in (2) is equal to 1, but clearly the expression in (3) is not equal to 1. Therefore, there must be more primes than  p1, ..., pN.

Proof using Legendre's formula

In 2010, Junho Peter Whang published the following proof by contradiction.  Let k be any positive integer.  Then according to Legendre's formula (sometimes attributed to de Polignac)

 

where

 

 

But if only finitely many primes exist, then

 

(the numerator of the fraction would grow singly exponentially while by Stirling's approximation the denominator grows more quickly than singly exponentially),
contradicting the fact that for each k the numerator is greater than or equal to the denominator.

Proof by construction

Filip Saidak gave the following proof by construction, which does not use reductio ad absurdum or Euclid's lemma (that if a prime p divides ab then it must divide a or b).

Since each natural number (> 1) has at least one prime factor, and two successive numbers n and (n + 1) have no factor in common, the product n(n + 1) has more different prime factors than the number n itself.  So the chain of pronic numbers:1×2 = 2 {2},    2×3 = 6 {2, 3},    6×7 = 42 {2, 3, 7},    42×43 = 1806 {2, 3, 7, 43},    1806×1807 = 3263442 {2, 3, 7, 43, 13, 139}, · · ·provides a sequence of unlimited growing sets of primes.

Proof using the incompressibility method
Suppose there were only k primes (p1, ..., pk). By the fundamental theorem of arithmetic, any positive integer n could then be represented as

where the non-negative integer exponents ei together with the finite-sized list of primes are enough to reconstruct the number. Since  for all i, it follows that  for all i (where  denotes the base-2 logarithm).  This yields an encoding for n of the following size (using big O notation):
 bits.
This is a much more efficient encoding than representing n directly in binary, which takes  bits. An established result in lossless data compression states that one cannot generally compress N bits of information into fewer than N bits. The representation above violates this by far when n is large enough since .  Therefore, the number of primes must not be finite.

Stronger results

The theorems in this section simultaneously imply Euclid's theorem and other results.

Dirichlet's theorem on arithmetic progressions

Dirichlet's theorem states that for any two positive coprime integers a and d, there are infinitely many primes of the form a + nd, where n is also a positive integer. In other words, there are infinitely many primes that are congruent to a modulo d.

Prime number theorem

Using asymptotic notation this result can be restated as

This yields Euclid's theorem, since

Bertrand–Chebyshev theorem 

In number theory, Bertrand's postulate is a theorem stating that for any integer , there always exists at least one prime number such that

 for all 

This statement was first conjectured in 1845 by Joseph Bertrand (1822–1900). Bertrand himself verified his statement for all numbers in the interval 
His conjecture was completely proved by Chebyshev (1821–1894) in 1852 and so the postulate is also called the Bertrand–Chebyshev theorem or Chebyshev's theorem.

Notes and references

External links
 
 Euclid's Elements, Book IX, Prop. 20 (Euclid's proof, on David Joyce's website at Clark University)

Articles containing proofs
Theorems about prime numbers